Zagheh (also Romanized as Zāgheh; also known as Zāgheh-ye Ḩoseynābād) is a village in, and the capital of, Ajorluy-ye Sharqi Rural District of Nokhtalu District of Baruq County, West Azerbaijan province, Iran. At the 2006 National Census, its population was 315 in 64 households, when it was in the former Baruq District of Miandoab County. The following census in 2011 counted 291 people in 72 households. The latest census in 2016 showed a population of 254 people in 73 households. After the census, Baruq District was separated from Miandoab County, elevated to the status of a county, and divided into two districts: the Central and Nokhtalu Districts.

References 

Populated places in West Azerbaijan Province